Theo Nischwitz (1913–1994) was a German cinematographer and special effects expert. Following the Second World War he was head of special effects at the Munich-based Bavaria Film. He was married to the film editor Gertrud Hinz.

Selected filmography

Cinematographer
 The Crew of the Dora (1943)
 Nights on the Road (1952)

Special effects
 Bombs on Monte Carlo (1931)
 F.P.1 (1933)
 Amphitryon (1935)
 The Adventures of Baron Munchausen (1943)
 Wherever the Trains Travel (1949)
 The Haunted Castle (1960)

References

Bibliography 
 Giesen, Rolf & Storm J.P. Animation Under the Swastika: A History of Trickfilm in Nazi Germany, 1933-1945. McFarland, 2012.

External links 
 

1913 births
1994 deaths
German cinematographers
Film people from Berlin